Sefer haYashar is a medieval Hebrew midrash, also known as the Toledot Adam and Divrei haYamim heArukh. The Hebrew title "Sefer haYashar" might be translated as the "Book of the Correct Record", but it is known in English translation mostly as The Book of Jasher following English tradition. Its author is unknown.

Other books of the same name
The book is named after the Book of Jasher mentioned in Joshua and 2 Samuel.

Although it is presented as the original "Book of Jasher" in translations such as that of Moses Samuel (1840), it is not accepted as such in rabbinical Judaism.  It should not be confused with the very different Book of Jasher (Pseudo-Jasher) printed by Jacob Ilive in 1751, which was purported to have been translated by the English monk Alcuin. It should also not be confused with an ethical text by the same name, which, according to the Encyclopaedia Judaica, Volume 14, p. 1099, was "probably written in the 13th century."

Content
The book covers biblical history from the creation of Adam and Eve until a summary of the initial Israelite conquest of Canaan in the beginning of the book of Judges.

The Bible twice quotes from a Sefer haYashar, and this midrashic work includes text that fits both Biblical references - the reference about the Sun and Moon found in Joshua, and also the reference in 2 Samuel (in the Hebrew but not in the Septuagint) to teaching the Sons of Judah to fight with the bow. This appears in Jasher 56:9 among the last words of Jacob to his son Judah:

Only teach thy sons the bow and all weapons of war, in order that they may fight the battles of their brother who will rule over his enemies. (MCR)

But the book as a whole was written much later - as shown by chapter 10, covering the descendants of Noah, but containing medieval names for territories and countries, most obviously Franza for France and Lumbardi in Italia for Lombardy. The text of this chapter closely follows the beginning of Josippon, a tenth-century rabbinic text that lists the various peoples living in Europe in ca. 950.

Most of its extra-Biblical accounts are found in nearly the same form in other medieval compilations, or in the Talmud, other midrash or Arabic sources. For example, it includes the common tale that Lamech and his son Jabal accidentally killed Cain, thus requiting Cain's wickedness for slaying Abel.

There are five discrepancies when comparing it with chapter 5 of Genesis: When the Sefer relates that a son of Seth died "in the eighty-fourth year of the life of Noah", it calls that son Enoch instead of Enosh. Enoch actually was Jared's son. Other than the confusion of the names, the date agrees with Genesis. The Sefer also relates that Jared died in the as "336th year of the life of Noah" (instead of the "336th year", as in Genesis) and that Lamech died in the "195th year of the life of Noah (instead of the 595th year). It also gives different lifespans for Lamech (770 instead of 777) and Methuselah (960 instead of 969).

In its genealogy of Abram (7:19), it makes no mention of the Cainan between Arpachsad and Shelah, in congruence with the Masoretic Text and Samaritan Pentateuch, but in conflict with the Septuagint (LXX) and Luke's genealogy in chapter 3 of his Gospel.

In its highly interpolated account of God's testing of Abraham concerning Isaac, it says in 23:50-51: "And when they were going along Isaac said to his father: Behold, I see here the fire and wood, and where then is the lamb that is to be the burnt offering before the Lord? And Abraham answered his son Isaac, saying: The Lord has made choice of thee my son, to be a perfect burnt offering instead of the lamb." This conflicts with the biblical account, in which Abraham's response was only: "My son, God will provide himself a lamb for a burnt offering".

The book (chapter Shemot) contains anecdotal material about Moses when he fled from Pharaoh after killing the Egyptian, and who is said to have fled to the land of Kush at the age of eighteen, where he was made the king of Kush at the age of twenty-seven, and there reigned for forty years before being deposed at the age of sixty-seven. According to this narrative, which is also alluded to in Josephus' Antiquities (2.10.1–2),  Moses assisted the indigenous peoples of the country in their conquest of one of the rebellious cities (whose proprietor was Bilʻam the sorcerer) and which had been under siege for nine years. The narrative recounts how that when the enemy's country was infested with poisonous serpents, Moses contrived a stratagem how they could advance on the besieged city and take it without suffering harm from the vipers, by bringing along with them caged birds who fed upon snakes, and releasing the hungry birds in the enemy's territory. At this advice, they were able to take the city and they made Moses their king, and gave to him in marriage the deceased king's wife, whose name was Adoniya (the widow of Qiqanos).

History
Scholars have proposed various dates between the 9th and 16th century for its composition.

The earliest extant version of this Hebrew midrash was printed in Venice in 1625, and the introduction refers to an earlier 1552 edition in Naples, of which neither trace nor other mention has been found. The printer Yosèf ben Samuel claimed the work was copied by a scribe named Jacob the son of Atyah, from an ancient manuscript whose letters could hardly be made out.

The Venice 1625 text was heavily criticised as a forgery by Leon Modena, as part of his criticisms of the Zohar as a forgery, and of Kabbalah in general. Modena was a member of the Venetian rabbinate that supervised the Hebrew press in Venice, and Modena prevented the printers from identifying Sefer ha-Yashar with the Biblical lost book.
	

Despite Modena's intervention, the preface to the 1625 version still claims that its original source book came from the ruins of Jerusalem in AD 70, where a Roman officer named Sidrus allegedly discovered a Hebrew scholar hiding in a hidden library. The officer Sidrus reportedly took the scholar and all the books safely back to his estates in Seville, Spain (in Roman known as Hispalis, the provincial capital of Hispania Baetica). The 1625 edition then claims that at some uncertain point in the history of Islamic Spain, the manuscript was transferred or sold to the Jewish college in Cordova. The 1625 edition further claims that scholars preserved the book until its printings in Naples in 1552 and in Venice in 1625. Apart from the preface to the 1625 work, there is no evidence to support any of this story. The work was used extensively, but not especially more than many other sources, in Louis Ginzberg's Legends of the Jews.

Although there remains doubt about whether the 1552 "edition" in Naples was ever truly printed, the study of Joseph Dan, professor of Kabbalah at the Hebrew University of Jerusalem, in the preface to his 1986 critical edition of the 1625 text concludes, from the Hebrew used and other indicators, that the work was in fact written in Naples in the early 16th century. The Arabic connections suggest that if the preface to the 1625 version is an "exaggeration", it was then probably written by a Jew who lived in Spain or southern Italy.

Translations

Johann Abicht's Latin translation
Johann Georg Abicht, professor of theology at the University of Halle-Wittenberg, translated the 1625 text into Latin as Dissertatio de Libro recti (Leipzig, 1732).

Moses Samuel's English translation
The first translation into English of the 1625 Venice edition was published in 1840 by Mordecai Manuel Noah and A. S. Gould. The translator was not named but was lauded by one of the four Hebraists who commented in the preface.

Subsequently, the translator identified himself as Moses Samuel of Liverpool (1795–1860), who had obtained a copy of the 1625 Hebrew edition and become convinced that the core of this work truly was the self-same Book of the Upright referenced in Hebrew scriptures. He translated the document into English and, after the Royal Asiatic Society at Calcutta declined to publish it, sold the translation to New York City publisher Noah for £150 in 1839. Samuel later said of the absence of his name on the translation that "I did not put my name to it as my Patron and myself differed about its authenticity" – Noah having had less confidence in the 1625 document than did Samuel.

Even so, Noah enthusiastically claimed in his promotional materials that the historian Josephus had said of the Book of Jasher "by this book are to be understood certain records kept in some safe place on purpose, giving an account of what happened among the Hebrews from year to year, and called Jasher or the upright, on account of the fidelity of the annals." No such statement is found in Josephus's works. Noah's 1840 preface contained endorsements by Hebrew scholars of the day, all of whom praised the quality of the translation, but these said nothing to indicate they believed it to be the work referred to in Joshua and 2 Samuel. In fact one of them, Samuel H. Turner (1790–1861), of the General Theological Seminary in New York City, commented that "The work itself is evidently composed in the purest Rabbinical Hebrew, with a large intermixture of the Biblical idiom", indicating he was not of the opinion that it was an ancient text.

Edward B.M. Browne English translation
Another translation of this book exists, created by Reform rabbi and editor, Dr. Edward B.M. Browne, known as “Alphabet” Browne, and published in New York in 1876.

Acceptance by Latter-day Saints
Joseph Smith, founder of the Latter Day Saint movement, acquired a copy in 1841 or 1842 and wrote in the September 1, 1842 edition of the Times and Seasons, in reference to the patriarch Abraham: "the book of Jasher, which has not been disproved as a bad author, says he was cast into the fire of the Chaldeans". David Whitmer of the Three Witnesses, arguing in favour of accepting scripture outside of the Biblical canon, later wrote in his 1887 Whitmerite tract An Address to All Believers in Christ, "There are over fifteen books spoken of in the Bible that are not in the Bible. […] I have a copy of the book of Jasher; It is spoken of in 2 Sam. i:18 and Joshua x:13."

John C. Hamer has speculated that narrative points in the Book of Jasher relating to Adam and Eve's "garments" and their acquisition by Nimrod may have influenced the development of the practice of wearing temple garments.

In 1886, Joseph Hyrum Parry of Salt Lake City acquired the rights to the translation from Mordecai Noah's estate. It was published by J. H. Parry & Company in Salt Lake City in 1887.

A number of Mormon scholars consider this Book of Jasher to be of authentic ancient Hebrew origin. Some of these scholars suggest that the book likely contains many original portions of the Sefer HaYashar referenced in the Old Testament but also has a number of added interpolations. This Joseph Hyrum Parry edition of the Book of Jasher continues to be held in high repute by many Mormons. A number of Mormons have pointed to certain portions of the book that have commonalities to parts of the Joseph Smith Translation of the Bible, particularly those parts dealing with the antediluvian period. The Bible has only scant information about pre-flood times, but both the Book of Jasher and parts of the Joseph Smith Translation of the Bible contain additional information, some of which is strikingly similar. The LDS Church does not officially endorse this Book of Jasher.

Editions
Hebrew editions
Sefer ha-Yashar, ed. Rosenthal, Berlin, 1898,
Sefer ha-Yashar, ed. Dan Joseph, Jerusalem, 1986
English translations:
Book of Jasher Referred to in Joshua and Second Samuel (1840), by Moses Samuel
Book of Jasher Referred to in Joshua and Second Samuel (1887), edited by J. H. Parry
various print-on-demand reprints including: Kessinger Publishing Company, ; The Authentic Annals of the Early Hebrews: Also Known as the Book of Jasher, edited by Wayne Simpson (Morris Publishing (NE), 1995) (Hardcover - January 1995)  hardcover; (Lightcatcher Books, 2003)  paperback, etc.
The Book Jashar: the Lost Book of the Bible, Mentioned in Joshua 10-13, and II Samuel 1-18 (1876), by Rev. Dr. Edward B. M. Browne.

References

External links
 Moses Samuel translation:
 The Book of Jasher - M.M. Noah & A.S Gould, New-York, 1840; with reviews for the 2nd edition, publisher and translators prefaces, translation of Hebrew Venice 1825 preface
 Plain text: Cumorah Project: LDS and World Classics (Based on 1840 translation; Includes translator's preface.)
 HTML:
 Christian Etherial Library: Anonymous (Based on J.H. Parry & Company, Salt Lake City 1887 reprint; With graphic reproduction of translator's preface.)
 Pseudepigrapha or Sacred Texts: Apocrypha  (Based on J.H. Parry & Company, 1887 Salt Lake City reprint)
 Google Books reprint published by J.H. Parry & Company, Salt Lake City, 1887
 
 Edward Browne translation:
 Google Books, published by United States Publishing Company, New York, 1876
 Sefer HaYashar on Sefaria

2nd-millennium texts
Aggadic Midrashim
Hebrew-language literature
Jewish medieval literature
Jewish texts
Oral Torah